Patricia Elaine "Tricia" Baumhardt (née Brock; born July 7, 1979) is an American contemporary Christian singer-songwriter raised in Dillsboro, Indiana. She is best known as the lead vocalist of the American Christian rock band Superchick. In 2011, she released her first full-length, solo studio album The Road as Tricia Brock. Her name was shortened to Tricia for her second album Radiate and its preview EP, Enough, in 2013.

Background
Brock's father is Paul Joseph Brock and her mother is Peggy; she has an older brother named Rodney Orrin Brock and also has an elder sister, former bandmate, Melissa Rose Brock. Brock grew up in Dillsboro, Indiana and was a member of the Christian rock band Superchick.

Discography

Albums

Singles

References

1979 births
Living people
American performers of Christian music
Musicians from Cincinnati
People from Dillsboro, Indiana
Inpop Records artists
Songwriters from Indiana
Songwriters from Ohio
20th-century American singers
21st-century American women singers
21st-century American singers
20th-century American women singers